Domenico 'Dominic' Canale (born in 1843), also known as D. Canale, was an Italian-American immigrant who founded the D. Canale & Co. distributorship in Memphis, Tennessee that became the largest distributor of produce throughout the Southern United States and the primary beer distributor for the Mid-South region.

Italian Heritage

Domenico was from San Pietro di Rovereto, a community within the municipality of Zoagli along the Italian Riviera, approximately 40 km southeast of Genoa.   The son of Giovanni Canale and A. Vaccaro, Domenico sailed to America in February 1859 at sixteen years old.  He landed in New Orleans after a 65-day voyage, and boarded the steamboat John Simon up the Mississippi River and settled in Memphis, Tennessee.

"Self-Made Man"

 Soon after arriving to Memphis in May 1859, Domenico began working for his uncle, who ran a thriving wholesale liquor business.  In 1866, Domenico saved up enough money to start up his own produce distribution business, "D. Canale & Co.," which grew considerably throughout the Southern United States as he imported fruits from around the world. The company also packaged and distributed a fine bourbon whiskey called “Old Dominick,” and a number of beers including Pabst Blue Ribbon and Champagne Velvet.  It was a natural extension for a produce house to distribute beer, since beer at that time was not pasteurized, and produce houses had refrigeration.

Liquor and beer sales ended during Prohibition, but once the law was repealed, the company shifted its interest to the distribution of beer and produce only.  Through the next several years, D. Canale & Co. became the largest produce distributor in the South.

The Southern Historical Association's 1905 book, Notable Men of Tennessee, which profiled prominent Tennesseans at the turn of the 20th century, observed that "Mr. Canale is what is rightly termed a self-made man, and has won his position in the social and commercial life of Memphis by his industry, his native ability and the exercise of correct business principles."  In 1869, D. Canale married Catherine Solari (1850–1923), the sister of Mary Solari, the famous Italian-American painter and first woman admitted to the Accademia di Belle Arti in Florence, Italy. Catherine and Domenico had eight children (5 sons and 3 daughters): John D., Andrew, Anthony, James, Annie (Welsh), Ester (Hoffman), Catherine, and George.  Notable Men of Tennessee also remarked that "[Domenico] is prouder of having rightly reared eight children than he is of his splendid success in business."

D. Canale & Co. in the Modern Era

 Following Domenico's death in 1919, the D. Canale & Co. passed down to Domenico's eldest son, John D., and then to John D. Canale Jr.  In 1956, D. Canale & Co. sold the produce division, and the company entered the institutional food business. In 1965, a restaurant material business was added, and another food broker was acquired, making D. Canale a force in the institutional food business with distribution in a five-state area.

In 1982, the food and beer business was spun off from the parent company and D. Canale Food Services and D. Canale Beverages were formed. John D. Canale III became president of Food Services and Chris W. Canale became Chairman of D. Canale Beverages.  In 1999, D. Canale Food Services was sold to Sara Lee.

D. Canale Beverages, with a payroll of over 200 employees, sold over 5 million cases of Anheuser-Busch products annually and had a gross revenue of $80 million in 2009.  Over many decades, it was the primary beer distributor for the Mid-South.

In September 2010, D. Canale & Co. sold its beer distributing business to the Hand Family Beverage Company of Clarksville, TN.  D. Canale, a staple of the Mid-South economy for 144 years as one of the oldest businesses in Memphis, is now known as Hand Family Beverage dba Budweiser of Memphis.

Gallery

References

Additional Information
 History of Memphis, Tennessee
 List of Italian-American business people
 Mary Solari
 Canale Arena

1843 births
1919 deaths
19th-century American businesspeople
20th-century American businesspeople
People from Memphis, Tennessee
Italian emigrants to the United States
Businesspeople from Tennessee